Hopwood is a suburb of Heywood, a town within the Metropolitan Borough of Rochdale, in Greater Manchester, England. It is north of the M62 motorway.

During the Middle Ages, Hopwood formed a township within the Middleton ecclesiastical parish of the Salfordshire hundred of Lancashire.

John Rhodes was one of the victims of the Peterloo Massacre of 1819. He died several weeks after the event and his body was dissected by order of magistrates wishing to prove his death was not a result of Peterloo.

Hopwood has a primary school and a fire station for the Greater Manchester Fire and Rescue Service. It also has a dentist, petrol station/shop and a cafe.

Transport
Hopwood is served by a number of buses including 162, 163, and 164. Hopwood is also a short distance from Heywood railway station.

References

Areas of the Metropolitan Borough of Rochdale
Heywood, Greater Manchester